Caspiana is an unincorporated community in Caddo Parish. It is located on La-1 with the Prairie River to the east and the Red River to the west.

History 
The town of Caspiana was once home to the Caspiana Plantation built by William Joseph Hutchinson (1839–1913). Parts of the former plantation have been relocated and are listed on the National Register of Historic Places, including the Caspiana House in Shreveport, and Caspiana Plantation Store in Natchitoches.

References

Unincorporated communities in Louisiana
Populated places in Ark-La-Tex
Unincorporated communities in Caddo Parish, Louisiana